Richard, Earl of Pembroke may refer to 
 Richard de Clare, 2nd Earl of Pembroke (1130–1176),  Lord of Leinster, Justiciar of Ireland; Cambro-Norman leader in the Norman invasion of Ireland
 Richard Marshal, 3rd Earl of Pembroke (1191–1234), Lord Marshal of England